Upper Canada Mall is the 25th largest shopping mall in Canada, located in Newmarket, Ontario, Canada. The mall is situated on the northwest corner of the Davis Drive West and Yonge Street intersection. The mall is owned and operated by Oxford Properties, one of the largest shopping centre development companies in Canada. It opened in 1974, at which time its layout was a north-south arrangement with two sunken sitting areas surrounded by brick planters on the lower level.

The mall is anchored by five retailers: Hudson’s Bay, Sportchek, Toys “R” Us, Stitches, and Designer Row.

History

Construction of the mall began in 1973. It opened in 1974 with 55 stores, two of which were the department store anchors Zellers (later Target) and Sears as well as a Dominion Supermarket, and a Kmart out parcel which became a Sears Home Store in 1999.

An Eaton's department store was added in the early 1990s, which later became a Hudson's Bay location. The original anchor Sears became an Urban Planet location and the space is now empty on the lower level, with Winners occupying the upper level.

A $60 million renovation was completed in 2008 adding 148,000 square feet (13 750 m²) to include a new 950-seat food court and 25 new fashion retailers including Forever 21, Zara, Victoria's Secret, Hollister Co. (closed 2020), Browns, HMV, Michael Kors, Apple Store, H&M, and Disney Store.  During the expansion and redevelopment, the Toys "R" Us store expanded, and eventually became the largest Toys "R" Us store in Canada.

On September 7, 2018, the mall opened Market & Co, an area with restaurants and food stores, after renovating and converting the space previously occupied by Zellers and later by Target. Sport Chek moved to the space that was not used by the new Market and Co. Dollarama took over the previous Sport Chek location.

See also
Largest shopping malls in Canada

Notes

References

External links

Upper Canada Mall
Oxford Properties
Upper Canada Mall facts

Shopping malls in the Regional Municipality of York
Shopping malls established in 1974
Buildings and structures in Newmarket, Ontario
Oxford Properties
1974 establishments in Ontario